Lago Merín is a village and resort on the coast of Lagoon Merín, in the Cerro Largo Department of Uruguay. Although it has a very few permanent inhabitants, it is an important summer resort. In the last years it has become an important kitesurfing location.

Geography
It is located near the borders.

Population
Lago Merín was officially declared resort in 1940 by president Alfredo Baldomir. In 2011 Lago Merín had a population of 439.
 
Source: Instituto Nacional de Estadística de Uruguay

References

External links

INE map of Lago Merín

Populated places in the Cerro Largo Department
Kitesurfing
Resorts in Uruguay